Campbell Collegiate is a public high school located in the Whitmore Park area of south Regina, Saskatchewan, Canada. A part of Regina Public Schools, it has operated since 1963 and currently has the largest student population among high schools in Regina.

Associate schools 
Campbell's associate schools include Connaught, Dr. A.E. Perry, Grant Road, Harbour Landing, Jack MacKenzie, Marion McVeety, Massey, W.S. Hawrylak, Wascana Plains, Wilfred Hunt and Wilfrid Walker.

Student Leadership Council (SLC) 

The Student Leadership Council (formerly the Student Representative Council) at Campbell Collegiate is responsible for student activities, including "Welcome Week" for Grade 9 students and pep rallies. The SLC Constitution is the rulebook which elaborates on the SLC's duties and responsibilities. It was ratified by the SLC and the student body in spring 2010.

In previous years, the student council was known as the Student Activities Council (SAC).

Athletics 
Campbell Collegiate hosts various athletic tournaments for high schools both from within the province and from out of the province as well as tournaments such as the Campbell Invitational Tournament (CIT) and the Campbell Invitational Volleyball Tournament (CIVT).

Campbell Collegiate won the SHSAA Provincial Championship in football for the 1973, 1975, 1976, 1996, 2010 and 2017 seasons. They’ve also won the 5A boys provincial basketball championship in 1975, 1976, 1982, 1997, 2005, 2009 and 2017, and boys volleyball in 2008 and 2012.

The Campbell senior girls volleyball team was the SHSAA 5A Provincial Champion in 2013, 2015, 2018 and 2019 and the senior girls basketball team were 5A champions in 1978 and 2014.

Music 

The school offers core music classes in each grade, as well as choral and band as credit courses. The Grade 9 Concert Band & Concert Choir introduce new students to playing in an ensemble environment. The school features open groups for older students as well. The Jazz Band and Senior Concert Choir groups offer all students, regardless of experience, an opportunity to learn, perform, and tour with a music group. Auditioned groups are available to more senior students. For instrument players, this is the Wind Ensemble group. For singers, this means a chance to sing with the Chamber Choir. However, further opportunity is given through the jazz programs. New musicians can join Senior Green, and new singers are invited to join Jazz Express. For those seeking a further challenge, choristers can audition for the intermediate jazz vocal group Take 10. The most challenging and powerful performances come from the top two groups, usually established members of either Wind Ensemble or Chamber Choir : the jazz band Senior Gold, and the jazz choir The Classics. Both groups perform out-of-province and in the United States.

Clubs 
Campbell Collegiate has a wide variety of clubs:

Anti-racism Cross-cultural Team 
Athletic Trainers
Book Club
Business Club
Computer Club
Creative Writing
Chinese Culture Club
Dead End Comics Club 
Debate Club
Environmental Club
Improv
Me to We
Model United Nations Club
Outdoors
Queer Straight Alliance
Robotics
Rubix Cubing Club
Social Justice Club
Tri-CF (ISCF)
Video Production
Yearbook Club

Sports 

Badminton
Baseball
Basketball (Senior & Junior, Boys & Girls)
Cheerleading
Cross Country
Curling
Football
Hockey
Rugby
Soccer (Boys & Girls)
Softball
Track & Field
Volleyball (Senior & Junior, Boys & Girls)
Wrestling
Handball

Golf

Notable alumni
Wade Regehr, Harvard neurobiologist
Jan Betker, Olympic curler
Eric Grimson, 1980 PhD from and Chancellor of Massachusetts Institute of Technology
Mike Blaisdell, NHL Hockey Player
N. Murray Edwards, lawyer and businessman
Connie Kaldor, musician
Sarah Lind, actress
Joel Lipinski, CFL football player
Lucas Makowsky, Olympic gold medalist speed skater
Amy Nixon, Olympic curler
Darren Veitch, NHL Hockey Player
Tesher, musician

Affiliated communities

Albert Park (pop. 11,450)
Arcola East - North (pop. 9995)
Arcola East - South (pop. 7665)
Boothill (pop. 2765)
Cathedral (pop. 7085)
Core Area (pop. 4430)
Gladmer Park (pop. 1470)
Glencairn (pop. 12,820)
Glenelm (pop. 3235)
Hillsdale (pop. 5795)
Lakeview (pop. 7600)
Whitmore Park (pop. 6425)
Windsor Park

Notes

External links

High schools in Regina, Saskatchewan
Educational institutions established in 1963
International Baccalaureate schools in Saskatchewan
1963 establishments in Saskatchewan